Sidell Township is a township in Vermilion County, Illinois, USA.  As of the 2010 census, its population was 1,073 and it contained 445 housing units.

History
Sidell Township was created in 1867.

Geography

Cities and towns
 Allerton (east three-quarters)
 Sidell

Unincorporated towns
 Archie
 Hastings

Adjacent townships
 Vance Township (north)
 Jamaica Township (northeast)
 Carroll Township (east)
 Young America Township, Edgar County (south)
 Newman Township, Douglas County (southwest)
 Ayers Township, Champaign County (west)
 South Homer Township, Champaign County (northwest)

Cemeteries
The township contains one cemetery, Fairview.

Major highways
  Illinois State Route 49

Demographics

References
 U.S. Board on Geographic Names (GNIS)
 United States Census Bureau cartographic boundary files

External links
 US-Counties.com
 City-Data.com
 Illinois State Archives

Townships in Vermilion County, Illinois
Townships in Illinois